Chapman is a borough in Northampton County, Pennsylvania. The population of Chapman was 223 as of the 2020 census. Chapman is part of the Lehigh Valley metropolitan area, which had a population of 861,899 and was the 68th most populous metropolitan area in the U.S. as of the 2020 census.

History
Chapman was named for William Chapman, who owned slate quarries there. William Chapman was from Cornwall, England. He was born in 1816 in Mt. Tonenshau in Brussels, where his mother had gone to nurse his father after being severely injured in the Battle of Waterloo. At the age of seven William started working in the Delabole slate quarries in Cornwall, where his father worked. At the age of 26, Chapman emigrated to the United States, where he leased property in Northampton County. He later purchased the property and started the Chapman Slate Company. 

While the quarries were originally opened in 1850, the company itself was officially incorporated by a special act of the Legislature of Pennsylvania in 1864 with a capital stock of $300,000. The quarry grew to a considerable size measuring from 700 to 800 feet along a longitudinal joint and was about 200 feet wide and 300 feet deep. William Chapman died in Bethlehem, Pennsylvania in 1903 at the age of 86.

Geography
Chapman is located at  (40.761567, -75.404270). It is drained by the Monocacy Creek into the Lehigh River. The township is surrounded by Moore Township

Transportation

Route 987 follows Chapman's southwestern boundary on its way between Klecknersville and Bath as Monocacy Drive. Its other primary two streets are east-to-west Fifth Street and north-to-south Main Street.

Demographics

As of the census of 2000, there were 234 people, 89 households, and 68 families residing in the borough. The population density was 620.1 people per square mile (237.8/km2). There were 91 housing units at an average density of 241.1 per square mile (92.5/km2). The racial makeup of the borough was 99.15% White, 0.43% African American and 0.43% Pacific Islander. Hispanic or Latino of any race were 0.43% of the population.

There were 89 households, out of which 31.5% had children under the age of 18 living with them, 59.6% were married couples living together, 6.7% had a female householder with no husband present, and 22.5% were non-families. 21.3% of all households were made up of individuals, and 6.7% had someone living alone who was 65 years of age or older. The average household size was 2.63 and the average family size was 2.91.

In the borough, the population was spread out, with 25.6% under the age of 18, 7.7% from 18 to 24, 26.9% from 25 to 44, 29.1% from 45 to 64, and 10.7% who were 65 years of age or older. The median age was 38 years. For every 100 females there were 112.7 males. For every 100 females age 18 and over, there were 114.8 males.

The median income for a household in the borough was $38,750, and the median income for a family was $42,917. Males had a median income of $36,000 versus $21,563 for females. The per capita income for the borough was $15,571. About 3.1% of families and 5.3% of the population were below the poverty line, including none of those under the age of eighteen and 20.8% of those sixty five or over.

Public education 
The Borough is served by the Northampton Area School District. Students in grades nine through 12 attend Northampton Area High School in Northampton.

References

1850 establishments in Pennsylvania
Boroughs in Northampton County, Pennsylvania
Boroughs in Pennsylvania
Populated places established in 1850